Jujubinus interruptus is a species of sea snail, a marine gastropod mollusk in the family Trochidae, the top snails.

Distribution
This species occurs in the following locations:
 Tanzania

References

 Spry, J.F. (1961). The sea shells of Dar es Salaam: Gastropods. Tanganyika Notes and Records 56

External links
 To World Register of Marine Species

interruptus
Gastropods described in 1828